Lazarus Chigwandali is a Malawian musician. He is a person with albinism. After being discovered performing on the streets of Lilongwe, he recorded his debut album with Swedish producer Johan Hugo. A film about Lazarus, produced by Madonna, featured at the Tribeca Film Festival in April 2019.

References

1980s births
Living people
21st-century Malawian male singers
People with albinism